T. Fisher Unwin was the London publishing house founded by Thomas Fisher Unwin, husband of British Liberal politician Jane Cobden in 1882.

Unwin was a co-founder of the Johnson Club, formed 13 September 1884, to mark the hundred years since the death of Dr Samuel Johnson.
 
The latterly more famous Stanley Unwin (his nephew) started his career by working in his uncle's firm. In 1914 Stanley Unwin purchased a controlling interest in the firm George Allen and Sons, and established George Allen and Unwin, later to become Allen and Unwin.

Unwin retired to his home in Sussex in 1926, following which his publishing house merged with Ernest Benn Limited.

Book series
The Adelphi Library
Army Examination Series
Autonym Library
Builders of Greater Britain
Cabinet Library (also known as: Unwin's Cabinet Library)
Centenary Series
The Children's Library
Every Irishman's Library
First Novel Library
Half-Holiday Handbooks
Independent Novels
Library of Irish Literature
The Library of Literary History
Little Novels
Lives Worth Living
Mermaid Series 
The Mind of the Century
The Modern Travel Series
Overseas Library
Pseudonym Library
The Reformer's Bookshelf
Six Shilling Novels
The Story of the Nations Library
Unwin's Colonial Library
 Unwin's Green Cloth Library
The Welsh Library

Further reading
Philip Unwin, The Publishing Unwins (London: William Heinemann Ltd., 1972)

References

Book publishing companies of the United Kingdom
Publishing companies established in 1882